Arras station (French: Gare d'Arras) is a railway station serving the town Arras, Pas-de-Calais department, northern France. This station, which opened in 1846, is located on the Paris–Lille railway and Arras-Dunkirk railway and accessible from LGV Nord. The train services are operated by SNCF.

Train services
The station is served by the following services:

High speed services (TGV) Valenciennes - Douai - Arras - Paris
High speed services (TGV) Dunkerque - Hazebrouck - Arras - Paris
High speed services (TGV) Lille - Arras - Paris
High speed services (TGV) Lille - Aeroport CDG - Lyon - Avignon - Marseille
High speed services (TGV) Lille - Aeroport CDG - Le Mans - Rennes / Angers - Nantes
High speed services (TGV) Lille - Aeroport CDG - St-Pierre-des-Corps - Bordeaux
Regional services (TER Hauts-de-France) Lille - Douai - Arras - Paris
Regional services (TER Hauts-de-France) Arras - Lens - Bethune - Hazebrouck
Local services (TER Hauts-de-France) Saint-Pol-sur-Ternoise - Arras

References

Railway stations in Pas-de-Calais
Gare
Railway stations in France opened in 1846